Ransome Judson Williams (January 4, 1892January 7, 1970) was the 102nd governor of South Carolina from 1945 to 1947.

Biography
Born in Cope, South Carolina, he graduated from the Medical University of South Carolina in Charleston and became employed as a pharmacist. He married Virginia Faith Allen, daughter of  Mr. and Mrs. Joel Isham Allen, on October 11, 1916. His political career began when he was first elected to the South Carolina House of Representatives and served from 1931 to 1932. In 1943, he was elected the 75th Lieutenant Governor of South Carolina and when Olin Johnston resigned from the Governorship in 1945, Williams became the 102nd Governor of South Carolina.

Williams sought re-election in 1946, but never had much popular support and finished a distant third to the eventual winner, Strom Thurmond. After the end of his term in 1947, he served as a trustee for numerous state colleges and died on January 7, 1970.

External links
SCIway Biography of Ransome Judson Williams
NGA Biography of Ransome Judson Williams

1892 births
1970 deaths
Democratic Party members of the South Carolina House of Representatives
Democratic Party governors of South Carolina
University of South Carolina trustees
20th-century American politicians